William E. Smith (June 18, 1824February 13, 1883) was an American merchant and politician who served as the 14th Governor of Wisconsin, the 5th State Treasurer of Wisconsin, and the 21st Speaker of the Wisconsin State Assembly.  He also served four years in the Wisconsin State Senate, representing Dodge County.  In business, he was the co-founder of Smith, Roundy & Co., which became the supermarket chain Roundy's.

Early life
Smith was born in Inverness, Scotland, in 1824, the son of Alexander and Sarah (Grant) Smith. He immigrated to the United States with his family as a child, and lived with his family in New York City and Michigan. He attended the common schools before working as a store clerk when he was 17. In 1846 he went to work for Lord & Taylor, and the following year he went to work for a wholesale company. In 1849 he moved to Fox Lake, Wisconsin, to become a partner in a mercantile firm.

Political career
He held several political position in Wisconsin and served two terms in the Wisconsin State Assembly beginning in 1851, including serving as speaker during the second term. Originally a Whig, he helped organize the new Republican Party in 1854. He served two terms in the Wisconsin State Senate from 1858 to 1865. Smith was Wisconsin state treasurer from 1866 to 1870. He was again elected to the State Assembly in 1871. He was a member of the board of regents of normal schools from 1858 to 1876, and director of the state prison from 1874 to 1878.

In 1872, Smith moved to Milwaukee and co-founded the Roundy's supermarket chain. He was elected governor in 1877 and served two terms from 1878 to 1882.

He died on February 13, 1883, in Milwaukee and is interred at Forest Home Cemetery in Milwaukee.

Family life
Smith and his wife Mary Booth were married in Michigan in 1849. They had four children.

Electoral history

Wisconsin Assembly (1870)

| colspan="6" style="text-align:center;background-color: #e9e9e9;"| General Election, November 8, 1870

Wisconsin Governor (1877, 1879)

| colspan="6" style="text-align:center;background-color: #e9e9e9;"| General Election, November 6, 1877

| colspan="6" style="text-align:center;background-color: #e9e9e9;"| General Election, November 7, 1879

See also
List of U.S. state governors born outside the United States

References

External links 
 National Governors Association
 Our Campaigns
 

1824 births
1883 deaths
Baptists from Wisconsin
Governors of Wisconsin
State treasurers of Wisconsin
Speakers of the Wisconsin State Assembly
Republican Party members of the Wisconsin State Assembly
Wisconsin state senators
Scottish emigrants to the United States
People from Inverness
People from Fox Lake, Wisconsin
Wisconsin Whigs
19th-century American politicians
Republican Party governors of Wisconsin
19th-century American merchants
Burials in Wisconsin
19th-century Baptists